The 1973–74 Danish 1. division season was the 17th season of ice hockey in Denmark. Ten teams participated in the league, and Gladsaxe SF won the championship. The Frederikshavn White Hawks were relegated.

First round

Final round
The top six teams qualified for the final round, and Gladsaxe SF finished first.

External links
Season on eliteprospects.com

Danish
1973 in Danish sport
1974 in Danish sport